Pulborough is a large village and civil parish in the Horsham district of West Sussex, England, with some 5,000 inhabitants. It is at the junction of the north–south A29 and the east–west (A283) roads.

The village is near the confluence of the River Arun and the River Rother, on the Stane Street Roman road from London to Chichester.  It looks southwards over the broad flood plain of the tidal Arun to a backdrop of the South Downs. It is on the northern boundary of the newly established South Downs National Park.

The parish covers an area of 5,183 acres (2,098 hectares). The twelfth-century parish church is dedicated to St Mary. In the 2001 census there were 4,685 people living in 1,976 households of whom 2,333 were economically active. At the 2011 Census the population of Bignor was included and the total population was 5,206.

History

Historically, it was a fording place over the River Arun used by the Romans, who had a mansio across the river at Hardham, one day's march from Chichester on the London road. The Saxons bridged the River Arun here and at nearby Stopham, north of its confluence with the River Rother. It became an important watering and overnight halt for cattle drovers providing easy access to water.

A mile to the west in woodland are the earthwork remains of a motte and bailey castle known as Park Mound, dating from the 11th century.

Transport connections afforded by the River Arun, its navigation, and later by the LBSCR Arun Valley Line brought Pulborough into the industrial age. Good road connections permitted, in the 20th century, the development of manufacturing industry, notably heavy engineering in London Road. This has long since closed down and the site now supports, among other things, a supermarket and a health centre. The village is  served by Pulborough railway station.

Attractions
Each year, Pulborough hosts the 12-hour lawn mower race which runs continuously for 12 hours.

On the fourth Saturday of September Pulborough hosts a traditional Harvest Fair complete with old time fair ground, welly wanging and a scarecrow competition, and in June the Pulborough duck race society holds its annual duck race, a charity event.

Pulborough is also home to the South Downs Light Railway with its steam and diesel trains running regularly throughout the summer, and a more limited service through the colder months.

Local cricket
Earliest records suggest cricket has been played in Pulborough since 1799. Now based at the Recreation Ground, Pulborough Cricket Club boasts numerous Senior and Junior (Colts) teams. Previously a member club of the Sussex Invitation League, Pulborough's 1st and 2nd Elevens were invited to join the Sussex Cricket League ("the county league") from the 2004 season. A 3rd League XI plays in the West Sussex League, home matches being played nearby at Watersfield. Pulborough was a founder member of the North West Sussex Colts Cricket League (now known as the iDentilam League) in 1987, when it became apparent that schools were not providing adequate cricketing opportunities to local youth. Various age-groups (Under 9s, 10s, 12s, 14s and 16s) now provide ample opportunity to develop cricket skills, played in a competitive environment and ultimately secure the long-term future of the club. The club also provides a mechanism for younger players to progress into senior cricket, with two non-league senior teams playing matches on Sunday afternoons. In 2006, the Sussex Cricket Board recognised the club's efforts towards youth sport, and awarded it ECB 'Focus Club' status. In 2008, the Club launches a junior girls team, thereby continuing the club's ongoing progressive and ambitious plans.

Other notable events
On 17 July 2000, Pulborough made the headlines when the body of missing girl Sarah Payne was found in a field off the A29 near the village. Roy Whiting, a 42-year-old convicted paedophile, was found guilty of her murder on 12 December 2001 and sentenced to life imprisonment.

On 19 April 2003, the body of 31-year-old Brighton music teacher Jane Longhurst, who had been strangled some weeks earlier, was found at Wiggonholt Common. Her best friend's partner Graham Coutts was found guilty of her murder on 4 February 2004 and sentenced to life imprisonment.

References

External links

Pulborough Parish Council

Horsham District
Villages in West Sussex